Hou Na (born March 24, 1988) is a Chinese former competitive figure skater. She competed for three seasons on the Junior Grand Prix and for one season on the Grand Prix of Figure Skating, placing 8th at the 2005 Cup of China and 9th at the 2005 Cup of Russia. Her highest placement at an ISU championship was 15th at the 2005 Four Continents Championships.

Programs

Competitive highlights 
GP: Grand Prix; JGP: Junior Grand Prix

References

External links
 
 Hou Na at Tracings.net

Chinese female single skaters
1988 births
Figure skaters from Harbin
Living people
Figure skaters at the 2003 Asian Winter Games